Robert Kai Iwabuchi is a Canadian retired ice hockey goaltender who was an All-American for North Dakota.

Career
Iwabuchi was recruited to North Dakota by John Gasparini and became a member of his first recruiting class when Gasparini was named head coach in 1978. Iwabuchi had to beat out Bill Stankoven and Mel Donnelly, two veteran Sioux netminders for the starting role. The pressure and excitement of his position caused Iwabuchi to vomit before most games which endeared him to his teammates, some of whom had the same issue. Iwabuchi became a hit as a freshman, helping the team finish atop the WCHA standings, defeating Minnesota in their final game to do so. Iwabuchi finished second in the nation in both goals against average and save percentage and was named as an All-American. He led UND on a run through the conference tournament and made the NCAA Tournament for the first time in eleven years. The Fighting Sioux received the top western seed and downed Dartmouth in the semifinal. In the championship, Stankoven got the start but allowed three goals to the Golden Gophers in the first period. With the team down by 2, Iwabuchi was in goal to start the second and he performed well in relief, turning aside 17 shots. After the team had cut their deficit to 1, Neal Broten scored a one-in-a-million goal over a sliding Iwabuchi to put Minnesota back ahead by 2. UND scored mid-way through the third to get within one again but a post got in the way of a tying goal and UND saw the championship slip away.

Iwabuchi was the starter to begin his sophomore season but his numbers weren't nearly as good. He was eventually replaced as the primary goalie by freshman Darren Jensen and provided capable backup goaltending for the team as it handily won the WCHA regular season crown, the WCHA tournament championship and the NCAA title. Iwabuchi left the program after the year and played with the Baltimore Clippers before retiring as a player.

After returning to the Edmonton area, Iwabuchi began working in with the family business in the food service industry and continued after they had been acquired by Sysco. He worked in the marketing department until his retirement.

Statistics

Regular season and playoffs

Awards and honors

References

External links

1957 births
Living people
AHCA Division I men's ice hockey All-Americans
Canadian ice hockey goaltenders
NCAA men's ice hockey national champions
North Dakota Fighting Hawks men's ice hockey players
Spruce Grove Mets players
Baltimore Skipjacks players
Ice hockey people from Edmonton